Chaturveda Prithudaka Swami was an Indian mathematician best known for his work on solving equations. He also wrote an important commentary on Brahmagupta's work.

References

Sources
 
 

9th-century Indian mathematicians